The Mongolian national basketball team is the basketball team that represents Mongolia in international competitions, administered by the Mongolian National Basketball Association.

Even though it is one of FIBA Asia's youngest members, the team enjoyed some great success at the East Asian Games. At the last event in October 2013, the Blue Wolves finished 5th, leaving behind Team Guam and Team Hong Kong.

History 
Mongolian men's basketball team had its first international competition in 1956 at the "China and Mongolian Railway Championships"

Scores

2022

2023

Competitive record

Summer Olympics

World championships

FIBA Asia Cup

Asian Games

East Asian Championship (EABA)

Roster

Depth chart

See also
Mongolia national under-19 basketball team
Mongolia national 3x3 team
Mongolia women's national basketball team
Mongolia women%27s national under-18 basketball team 18 насны эмэгтэй сагсан бөмбөгийн шигшээ баг
Mongolia men%27s national under-18 basketball team 18 насны эрэгтэй сагсан бөмбөгийн шигшээ баг

References

External links 
FIBA Profile
Mongolia National Basketball Association - Facebook presentation

2000 establishments in Mongolia
 
Men's national basketball teams